The Spica class were a class of torpedo boats of the Regia Marina (Royal Italian Navy) during World War II. These ships were built as a result of a clause in the Washington Naval Treaty, which stated that ships with a tonnage of less than 600 could be built in unlimited numbers. Thirty-two ships were built between 1934 and 1937, thirty of which entered service with Italy and two which were sold to the Swedish Navy in 1940. The two units in Swedish service were classed as destroyers until 1953, then re-classified as corvettes. Although commonly referred to as torpedo boats due to their smaller displacement, the Spica class armaments were similar in design to destroyers (their design was influenced by the  then in development), and were intended for anti-submarine duties, although they often had to fight aircraft and surface forces as well. Twenty-three vessels were lost during World War II.

Design
The design work started in 1932 and two prototypes, Spica and Astore, were built. Propulsion consisted of a two shaft geared turbine layout with two Yarrow–type boilers. The armament consisted of three /47 caliber dual-purpose guns in single mountings in 'A', 'X' and 'Y' positions and three or four twin  anti-aircraft machine guns—later replaced by 9 to 11 Breda 20/65 modello 35 20 mm cannons in various configurations. They also carried four  torpedo tubes, two for each side, which had a shorter range and a smaller warhead than the  ones in use on destroyers.

Ships

Notes to table:

See also
 , an enlarged version of the class

Footnotes

Notes

Citations

Bibliography

External links

 Classe Spica (1933-1940) Marina Militare website
 History of the class  at italie1935-45.com 
 Diving around the wreck of Aldebaran 

Torpedo boat classes
 
World War II torpedo boats of Italy
Ships built in Italy